Middle Empire may refer to:

 Middle Empire, see names of China
 Middle Eastern empires have existed in the Middle East at various periods between 5000 BCE and 1924 CE 
 Middle Assyrian Empire, a period in the history of Assyria after the fall of the Old Assyrian Empire in the 1300s BC

See also
Middle Kingdom (disambiguation)
Middle power
Middle-earth
Central African Empire
List of medieval great powers